Martha McDonald (born 1964, Pittsburgh, PA) is an interdisciplinary artist living and working in Philadelphia. Her  "performances and installations feature handcrafted costumes and objects that she activates through gestures of making and unmaking and singing to transmit narrative. McDonald's practice often focuses on site-specific 'interventions' in historic house museums, libraries and gardens which investigate the sites and their stories to explore how these public places connect with personal histories and emotional states."

Notable works 
Hospital Hymns: Elegy for Lost Soldiers
The Lost Garden
The Weeping Dress

External links
What Artist Martha Mcdonald Might Teach Us About a Nation Divided
official website

References

1964 births
Living people
20th-century American artists
20th-century American women artists
21st-century American artists
21st-century American women artists
Artists from Pittsburgh